Ardsley High School is a public high school located in Ardsley, New York, in the New York City metropolitan area. It is a part of the Ardsley Union Free School District.

The school was established in 1957 and serves students in grades 9–12. An extension was built onto the school and was completed in 2006. The school principal is Danielle Trippodo.

History
From the years 1920–1935, the population in Ardsley doubled; therefore an addition was added to the 'old' high school in 1925. The addition included more classrooms and a gym. By the second population boom during the post World War II  years, the Ardsley School District sought to build a new High School on the former Lewisohn Estate on Washington Hill, which burned to the ground in 1957. Ardsley High School opened its door to students for the 1957–1958 school year.

Athletics
Ardsley competes in Section 1 of the New York State Public High School Athletic Association.

Sports offered at Ardsley include:

cross country
football
soccer
swimming
tennis
volleyball
basketball
bowling
fencing
skiing
track (both winter and spring)
wrestling
baseball
golf
lacrosse

Notable alumni

 Richard Brodsky  New York State Assemblyman 
 Jesse McCartney  Grammy-nominated pop singer, actor and songwriter
 Devi Nampiaparampil  physician, researcher, and television medicine correspondent
 Gil Parris  Grammy-nominated rock, blues, jazz and pop guitarist
 Peter Riegert  actor, director and screenwriter
 Vic Ruggiero  musician, songwriter, and producer 
 Mark Zuckerberg  founder and chairman of Facebook

References

External links

 Ardsley High School official website

Educational institutions established in 1957
Public high schools in Westchester County, New York
1957 establishments in New York (state)